Heinz Frei (born 28 January 1958) is a Swiss wheelchair athlete. Frei has had a long career of racing, winning the London Marathon wheelchair race three times, and earning five medals at the 2003 European games at the age of 45. He has earned 15 gold medals at the summer and winter Paralympics and is a current world record holder in the marathon wheelchair race. He competed in athletics at every Summer Paralympic Games from 1984 to 2008, and at the 2008, 2012 and 2016 Summer Olympics he competed in cycling, using a handcycle. At the Winter Paralympics, he competed in cross-country sit-skiing between 1984 and 2006 and in the biathlon in 1994.

Frei planned to retire from track competition at an event on 28 August 2009, though he will continue competing in road races.

See also
Athletes with most gold medals in one event at the Paralympic Games

References

External links 
 

1958 births
Living people
Swiss male wheelchair racers
Swiss male cross-country skiers
Paralympic athletes of Switzerland
Athletes (track and field) at the 1984 Summer Paralympics
Athletes (track and field) at the 1988 Summer Paralympics
Athletes (track and field) at the 1992 Summer Paralympics
Athletes (track and field) at the 1996 Summer Paralympics
Athletes (track and field) at the 2000 Summer Paralympics
Athletes (track and field) at the 2004 Summer Paralympics
Athletes (track and field) at the 2008 Summer Paralympics
Paralympic cross-country skiers of Switzerland
Cross-country skiers at the 1984 Winter Paralympics
Cross-country skiers at the 1988 Winter Paralympics
Cross-country skiers at the 1992 Winter Paralympics
Cross-country skiers at the 1994 Winter Paralympics
Cross-country skiers at the 1998 Winter Paralympics
Cross-country skiers at the 2006 Winter Paralympics
Paralympic biathletes of Switzerland
Biathletes at the 1994 Winter Paralympics
Paralympic cyclists of Switzerland
Cyclists at the 2008 Summer Paralympics
Paralympic gold medalists for Switzerland
Paralympic silver medalists for Switzerland
Paralympic bronze medalists for Switzerland
World record holders in Paralympic athletics
Place of birth missing (living people)
Wheelchair racers at the 2000 Summer Olympics
Paralympic wheelchair racers
Medalists at the 1984 Winter Paralympics
Medalists at the 1988 Winter Paralympics
Medalists at the 1992 Winter Paralympics
Medalists at the 1998 Winter Paralympics
Medalists at the 1984 Summer Paralympics
Medalists at the 1988 Summer Paralympics
Medalists at the 1992 Summer Paralympics
Medalists at the 1996 Summer Paralympics
Medalists at the 2000 Summer Paralympics
Medalists at the 2008 Summer Paralympics
Medalists at the 2012 Summer Paralympics
Swiss male biathletes
Paralympic medalists in athletics (track and field)
Paralympic medalists in cycling
Paralympic medalists in cross-country skiing